Carlo Rovelli (born May 3, 1956) is an Italian theoretical physicist and writer who has worked in Italy, the United States and, since 2000, in France. He is also currently a Distinguished Visiting Research Chair at the Perimeter Institute, and core member of the Rotman Institute of Philosophy of Western University.
He works mainly in the field of quantum gravity and is a founder of loop quantum gravity theory. He has also worked in the history and philosophy of science. He collaborates with several Italian newspapers, including the cultural supplements of the Corriere della Sera, Il Sole 24 Ore and La Repubblica.
His popular science book, Seven Brief Lessons on Physics, was originally published in Italian in 2014. It has been translated into 41 languages and has sold over a million copies worldwide. In 2019, he was included by Foreign Policy magazine in a list of 100 most influential global thinkers.

Life and career
Carlo Rovelli was born in Verona, Italy, on 3 May 1956. He attended the Liceo Classico Scipione Maffei in Verona. In the 1970s, he participated in the student political movements in Italian universities. He was involved with the free political radio stations Radio Alice in Bologna and Radio Anguana in Verona, which he helped found. In conjunction with his political activity, he was charged, but later released, for crimes of opinion related to the book Fatti Nostri, which he co-authored with Enrico Palandri, Maurizio Torrealta, and Claudio Piersanti.

Rovelli has credited his use of LSD at this time with sparking his interest in theoretical physics, saying of his experience: "it was an extraordinarily strong experience that touched me also intellectually... Among the strange phenomena was the sense of time stopping. Things were happening in my mind but the clock was not going ahead; the flow of time was not passing any more... And I thought: ‘Well, it's a chemical that is changing things in my brain. But how do I know that the usual perception is right, and this is wrong? If these two ways of perceiving are so different, what does it mean that one is the correct one?"

In 1981, Rovelli graduated with a BS/MS in physics from the University of Bologna, and in 1986 he obtained his PhD at the University of Padova, Italy. Rovelli refused military service, which was compulsory in Italy at the time, and was therefore briefly detained in 1987. He held postdoctoral positions at the University of Rome, the International School for Advanced Studies in Trieste, and Yale University. Rovelli was on the faculty of the University of Pittsburgh from 1990 to 2000, where he was also affiliated with the Department of History and Philosophy of Science. Since 2000 he has been a professor at the Centre de Physique Théorique de Luminy of Aix-Marseille University in France.

Main contributions

Loop quantum gravity
In 1988, Rovelli, Lee Smolin and Abhay Ashtekar introduced a theory of quantum gravity called loop quantum gravity. In 1995, Rovelli and Smolin obtained a basis of states of quantum gravity, labelled by Penrose's spin networks, and using this basis they were able to show that the theory predicts that area and volume are quantized. This result indicates the existence of a discrete structure of space on a very small scale. In 1997, Rovelli and Michael Reisenberger introduced a "sum over surfaces" formulation of the theory, which has since evolved into the currently covariant "spinfoam" version of loop quantum gravity. In 2008, in collaboration with Jonathan Engle and Roberto Pereira, he has introduced the spin foam vertex amplitude which is the basis of the current definition of the loop quantum gravity covariant dynamics. Loop theory is today considered a candidate for a quantum theory of gravity. It finds applications in quantum cosmology, spinfoam cosmology and quantum black hole physics.

Physics without time
In his 2004 book, Quantum Gravity, Rovelli developed a formulation of classical and quantum mechanics that does not make explicit reference to the notion of time. The first step towards a theory of quantum gravity without a time variable is described by Wheeler–DeWitt equation. The timeless formalism is used to describe the world in the regimes where the quantum properties of the gravitational field cannot be disregarded.  This is because the quantum fluctuation of spacetime itself makes the notion of time unsuitable for writing physical laws in the conventional form of evolution laws in time.

This position led him to face the following problem: if time is not part of the fundamental theory of the world, then how does time emerge? In 1993, in collaboration with Alain Connes, Rovelli proposed a solution to this problem called the thermal time hypothesis. According to this hypothesis, time emerges only in a thermodynamic or statistical context. If this is correct, the flow of time is not fundamental, deriving from the incompleteness of knowledge. Similar conclusions had been reached earlier in the context of nonequilibrium statistical mechanics, in particular in the work of Robert Zwanzig, and in Caldeira-Leggett models used in quantum dissipation.

Relational quantum mechanics
In 1994, Rovelli introduced the relational interpretation of quantum mechanics, based on the idea that the quantum state of a system must always be interpreted relative to another physical system (like the "velocity of an object" is always relative to another object, in classical mechanics). The idea has been developed and analyzed in particular by Bas van Fraassen and by Michel Bitbol. Among other important consequences, it provides a solution of the EPR paradox that does not violate locality.
Rovelli has expressed the main idea of relational quantum mechanics in the popular book Helgoland.

Relative information
Rovelli won the second prize in the 2013 FQXi contest "It From Bit or Bit From It?" for his essay about "relative information". His paper, Relative Information at the Foundation of Physics, discusses how "Shannon's notion of relative information between two physical systems can function as [a] foundation for statistical mechanics and quantum mechanics, without referring to subjectivism or idealism...[This approach can] represent a key missing element in the foundation of the naturalistic picture of the world." In 2017, Rovelli elaborated further upon the subject of relative information, writing that: In nature, variables are not independent; for instance, in any magnet, the two ends have opposite polarities. Knowing one amounts to knowing the other. So we can say that each end “has information” about the other. There is nothing mental in this; it is just a way of saying that there is a necessary relation between the polarities of the two ends. We say that there is "relative information" between two systems anytime the state of one is constrained by the state of the other. In this precise sense, physical systems may be said to have information about one another, with no need for a mind to play any role. Such "relative information" is ubiquitous in nature: The colour of the light carries information about the object the light has bounced from; a virus has information about the cell it may attach, and neurons have information about one another. Since the world is a knit tangle of interacting events, it teems with relative information. When this information is exploited for survival, extensively elaborated by our brain, and may be coded in a language understood by a community, it becomes mental, and it acquires the semantic weight that we commonly attribute to the notion of information. But the basic ingredient is down there in the physical world: physical correlation between distinct variables. The physical world is not a set of self-absorbed entities that do their selfish things. It is a tightly knitted net of relative information, where everybody's state reflects somebody else's state. We understand physical, chemical, biological, social, political, astrophysical, and cosmological systems in terms of these nets of relations, not in terms of individual behaviour. Physical relative information is a powerful basic concept for describing the world. Before “energy,” “matter,” or even “entity.”

History and philosophy of science

Rovelli has written a book on the Greek philosopher Anaximander, published in France, Italy, US and Brazil. The book analyses the main aspects of scientific thinking and articulates Rovelli's views on science. Anaximander is presented in the book as a main initiator of scientific thinking.

For Rovelli, science is a continuous process of exploring novel possible views of the world; this happens via a "learned rebellion", which always builds and relies on previous knowledge but at the same time continuously questions aspects of this received knowledge. The foundation of science, therefore, is not certainty but the very opposite, a radical uncertainty about our own knowledge, or equivalently, an acute awareness of the extent of our ignorance.

Religious views
Rovelli defines himself "serenely atheist". He discussed his religious views in several articles and in his book on Anaximander. He argues that the conflict between rational/scientific thinking and structured religion may find periods of truce ("there is no contradiction between solving Maxwell's equations and believing that God created Heaven and Earth"), but it is ultimately unsolvable because (most) religions demand the acceptance of some unquestionable truths while scientific thinking is based on the continuous questioning of any truth. Thus, for Rovelli, the source of the conflict is not the pretense of science to give answers the universe, for Rovelli is full of mystery and a source of awe and emotions but, on the contrary, the source of the conflict is the acceptance of our ignorance at the foundation of science, which clashes with religions' pretense to be depositories of certain knowledge.

Main awards
1995 International Xanthopoulos Award of the International Society for General Relativity and Gravitation, "for outstanding contributions to theoretical physics"
Senior member of the Institut Universitaire de France
Laurea Honoris Causa National University of General San Martín
Honorary Professor of the Beijing Normal University in China
Member of the Académie Internationale de Philosophie des Sciences
Honorary member of the Accademia di Scienze Arti e Lettere di Verona
2009 First "community" prize of the FQXi contest on the "nature of time"
2013 Second prize of the FQXi contest on the "relation between physics and information"
2014  for the book Reality Is Not What It Seems: The Journey to Quantum Gravity
2015 Premio Pagine di Scienza di Rosignano for the book Reality Is Not What It Seems: The Journey to Quantum Gravity
2015 Premio Alassio centolibri per l’informazione culturale
2015 Premio Larderello
2015  for the book Reality Is Not What It Seems: The Journey to Quantum Gravity

Popular culture

Rovelli has appeared as a Disney character in a Mickey Mouse story in the Italian Disney publication of Topolino.
In November 2022 Carlo Rovelli and rock band Belladonna release the single Nothing Shines Unless It Burns. 
In the science fiction novel Mars Trilogy by Kim Stanley Robinson, set in a future century, Rovelli and Lee Smolin appear as historical characters in the history of physics. In the novel, Loop quantum gravity has merged to string theory to give a comprehensive physical theory of the world. 
The book The Order of Time has been published in audiobook format read by the British actor Benedict Cumberbatch. 
In Treacle Walker (2021) Alan Garner chose a quote from Rovelli's The Order of Time (L'ordine del tempo, 2017) as the epigraph for his book.
Interviews on BBC radio:
The BBC Radio 4 show Desert Island Discs in summer 2017.
The BBC Radio 4 show The Life Scientific in 2018 (discussing his career in science).
The BBC Radio 3 show Private Passions in 2020 (discussing time in music and science) 
The BBC Radio 4 show A Good Read in 2020 (discussing books).
He appeared on BBC Radio 4's The Museum of Curiosity in February 2023. His hypothetical donation to this imaginary museum was a white hole.

Books and articles
Rovelli has written more than 200 scientific articles published in international journals. He has published two monographs on loop quantum gravity and several popular science books. His book, Seven Brief Lessons on Physics, has been translated into 41 languages.

Scientific books
Quantum Gravity, Cambridge University Press, 2004, 
With Francesca Vidotto, Covariant Loop Quantum Gravity: An Elementary Introduction to Quantum Gravity and Spinfoam Theory, Cambridge University Press, 2014,

Popular books
(In preparation) Anaximander: And the Birth of Science, Penguin Random House February 2, 2023 Helgoland, Penguin Random House 2021 / Helgoland, Adelphi, 2020.There Are Places in the World Where Rules Are Less Important Than Kindness, Penguin Random House, 2020 / Ci sono luoghi al mondo dove più che le regole è importante la gentilezza, Solferino, 2020.The Order of Time, Penguin Random House, 2018 / L'ordine del tempo, Adelphi, 2017.Reality Is Not What It Seems: The Journey to Quantum Gravity, Penguin Random House, 2016 / La realtà non è come ci appare: La struttura elementare delle cose, Raffaello Cortina Editore, 2014.Seven Brief Lessons on Physics, Penguin Random House, 2015 / Sette brevi lezioni di fisica, Adelphi, 2014.The first scientist Anaximander and his legacy, Westholme Publishing, 2011 / Che cos'è la Scienza. La rivoluzione di Anassimandro., Mondadori, 2012.What is time, what is space? (interview), Di Renzo Editore, 2006 / Che cos'é il tempo, che cos'é lo spazio?, Di Renzo Editore, 2004.

References

External links

Homepage
Introduction to Loop Quantum Gravity, online course by Carlo Rovelli.
Carlo Rovelli, A Dialog on Quantum Gravity, preprint available as hep-th/0310077
Loop Quantum Gravity by Carlo Rovelli
Quantum Gravity, draft of the book Quantum Gravity''
Curriculum Vitae et Studiorum

1956 births
Living people
Quantum physicists
Italian relativity theorists
Loop quantum gravity researchers
University of Pittsburgh faculty
University of Padua alumni
University of Bologna alumni
Academic staff of Aix-Marseille University